The 1912 Coupe de Chamonix was the fourth edition of the Coupe de Chamonix, an international ice hockey tournament. It was held from January 15-17, 1912, in Chamonix, France. Club des Patineurs de Paris from France won the tournament.

Results

Final Table

External links
 Tournament on hockeyarchives.info

Coupe de Chamonix
Chamonix
Chamonix